Frank Martin Williams (April 11, 1873 – February 20, 1930) was an American lawyer, civil engineer and politician from New York. He was New York State Engineer and Surveyor from 1909 to 1910, and from 1915 to 1922.

Biography
He was born on April 11, 1873, in Verona, New York.

He graduated from Colgate University in 1895. Then he studied law at Oneida, New York, graduated from Syracuse University College of Law in 1897, but did not practice. In 1898, he entered the Department of the State Engineer and rose through the ranks up to Resident Engineer.

He was State Engineer and Surveyor from 1909 to 1910, and from 1915 to 1922, elected on the Republican ticket in 1908, defeated for re-election in 1910 and 1912 by Democrat John A. Bensel, and elected again in 1914, 1916, 1918 and 1920.

From 1911 to 1914, he was engaged in the construction of highways in Ohio.

He died on February 20, 1930, in Albany, New York. He was buried at the Glenwood Cemetery in Oneida.

External links
 His appointments, in NYT on December 25, 1908
 The Rep. state convention, with short bios of the nominees, in NYT on September 28, 1912

1873 births
1930 deaths
New York State Engineers and Surveyors
Syracuse University College of Law alumni
American civil engineers
People from Verona, New York
Colgate University alumni
New York (state) Republicans